Nicholas Jones (born 3 April 1946) is an English character actor who has appeared on stage, film and television.

Early life
Jones was born in London, the younger brother of actress Gemma Jones. They are the children of actor Griffith Jones (1909–2007) and Robin Isaac. He was educated at Westminster School.

Jones's acting career started in 1965, when he became a stage manager at the Everyman Theatre, Liverpool. He made the scenery, set the lights and ran the shows. 
After taking on various small acting roles, Terry Hands, the theatre director, suggested he should be doing more acting, so he auditioned for the Bristol Old Vic Theatre School. 
He arrived a day late, due to travelling from Liverpool in a 1946 Triumph Roadster and, for the first and only time, used his father's name to get to see the principal. Following his audition, he was invited to start the following term.
In 1968, Jones graduated from the school and, as part of the 'Gold Medal’ prize, was invited to go to the Bristol Old Vic.

Career
Jones has had a distinguished career, playing leads on television, at The National Theatre and on the West End Stage. He also followed in his father's footsteps by appearing with the Royal Shakespeare Company (1999), and has starred at Shakespeare's Globe. One of his first screen roles was as Laertes opposite Richard Chamberlain's Hamlet in 1970.

Personal life

Jones has been practising devotional yoga since 1973. It is a meditational discipline.

As a pilot, Jones performed his first 'slow roll’ in a Chipmunk 10 hours after his first solo flight and landed in a farmer's field for a Boxing Day party.

He has windsurfed at home, abroad and on the Isle of Tiree in Scotland. He is a 2nd Dan in Kickboxing - one belt beyond a black belt. Now in his 70s, he spends much of his free time kayaking, cycling, riding his motorbike, collecting 19th century literature and playing the piano.
Jones has written for the radio, a television series, a play and a book of anecdotes about his experiences for his daughter India. This is an ongoing project.

Filmography

Film
The Corpse (1971) - Benjy Smith
Wolfshead: The Legend of Robin Hood (1973) - Squire
The Blockhouse (1973) - Kramer
Daisy Miller (1974) - Charles
When the Whales Came (1989) - Vicar
This Year's Love (1999) - James
On Wings of Fire (2001)
And Now... Ladies and Gentlemen (2002) - London Jeweller
Vanity Fair (2004) - Lord Darlington
Vera Drake (2004) - Defence Barrister
Copying Beethoven (2006) - Archduke Rudolph
Surveillance (2007) - Lord Raven (Jake's Father)
Flawless (2007) - Jameson
The Lady (2011) - Robert Gordon, UK Ambassador 1995-1999
The Iron Lady (2011) - Admiral Henry Leach
Philomena (2013) - Dr. Robert
Mr Turner (2014) - Sir John Soane
Effie Gray (2014) - Doctor Lee
In the Heart of the Sea (2015) - Pollard Senior
War Machine (2017) - Dick Waddle
Darkest Hour (2017) - Sir John Simon
The Children Act (2017) - Professor Rodney Carter

Television
Since 1969, Jones has acted in over 90 television films and series.

In the 1970s, he starred as Captain Triggers in the First World War series, Wings, alongside Tim Woodward and Michael Cochrane, perhaps his most iconic role.  He also played Jeremy Aldermarten QC in all six series of the 1990s courtroom drama, Kavanagh QC. alongside John Thaw.

Jones' many appearances include the following:

Not a Penny More, Not a Penny Less (1990, TV Movie) - Dr. Robin Oakley
A Dangerous Man: Lawrence After Arabia (1992, TV Movie) - Lord Dyson
Unnatural Causes (1993, TV Movie) - Luker
Lipstick on Your Collar (1993) - Major Carter
Sharpe's Company (1994, TV Movie) - Col. Fletcher
Bramwell (1995) - Lord Edward Carstairs
A Touch of Frost (1996) - Major Harvey
The Beggar Bride (1997) - Sir Fabian Ormerod
A Dance to the Music of Time (1997) - Bob Duport
Hornblower: Mutiny (2002) - Lieutenant Buckland
Hornblower: Retribution (2002) - Lieutenant Buckland
The Alan Clark Diaries (2004) - Peter Morrison, MP
Sensitive Skin (2005)
Dunkirk (2005) – Major Angus McCorquodale
New Tricks (2005) - Michaela Pendle
Inspector George Gently (2006) - Henry Blythely
Silent Witness  (2006) - Dr Harvey Wilson
Eleventh Hour  (2006) - Dr Sidney Hayward
Spooks (2006) - Michael Collingwood
Rebus (2007, Series 4, Episode 3) - Commander Steelforth
Little Dorrit (2008) - The Scary Butler
Margaret (2009) - Tim Renton, MP
Midsomer Murders (2010-2014) - Ernest Bradley / Reverend Moreland
The Shadow Line  (2011) - Commander Penney
Waking the Dead (2011) - Leo Harding
Silk  (2012) - Judge Goodbrand
The Hollow Crown  (2012) - Archbishop of York
Holby City (2012) - Jeremy Hamilton
Henry IV, Part II (2012) - the Archbishop of York
Twenty Twelve (2012) - Tony Griffiths
The Best of Men (2012) - Major-General Harold Henry Blake
The Suspicions of Mr Whicher  (2014) - Sir Edwards Shore
Law & Order (2014) - Edmund Rintoul
Father Brown (2014) - Colonel Cecil Gerard
Arthur & George (2015) - Judge Atkins
Lewis (2015) - Philip Hathaway
Mid Morning Matters with Alan Partridge (2016) - Cecil Croom-Phillips
The Crown (2016) - Charles Wilson
Count Arthur Strong (2017) - Judge
The Moorside (2017) - Judge
Absentia (2017) - Irving 
Pennyworth (2019) - Sir Francis Tewkes
House of the Dragon (2022) - Lord Bartimos Celtigar

References

External links
 

1946 births
Alumni of RADA
English male film actors
English male soap opera actors
Living people
People educated at Westminster School, London
Male actors from London
English people of Welsh descent
20th-century English male actors
21st-century English male actors